The 2018 Sikkim Premier Division League was the seventh season of the Sikkim Premier Division League, the top division football league in the Indian state of Sikkim. The league kicked off from 21 July 2018 with eight teams competing.

Teams
The teams participating in the 2018 league:
 United Sikkim FC
 State Sports Academy
 Boy's Club
 Pakyong United FC
 Sikkim Himalayan SC
 Sikkim Aakraman FC
 SAI Namchi
 Unicorn FC

References

Sikkim Premier Division League
2018–19 in Indian football leagues